The King George VI and Queen Elizabeth Memorial, situated between The Mall and Carlton Gardens in central London, is a memorial to King George VI and his consort, Queen Elizabeth. Completed in its present form in 2009, the memorial incorporates an earlier, Grade II listed statue of George VI by William McMillan, unveiled by his daughter Queen Elizabeth II in 1955. The reconfigured memorial, which includes a statue of the Queen Mother by Philip Jackson, relief sculpture by Paul Day and an architectural setting by Donald Buttress and Donald Insall, was unveiled by Elizabeth II in 2009.

Statue of King George VI
The statue of King George VI was sculpted in bronze by William McMillan, and depicts him in his naval uniform. The statue stands on a base of Portland stone. The statue was unveiled by Elizabeth II in the presence of her mother and other senior members of the royal family. The architect of the memorial was Louis de Soissons. It was feared that the location of the memorial would aesthetically disrupt The Mall, adding a further set of steps so near to the Duke of York Column, but it was positively received upon unveiling on 6 October 1955.

The statue was designated a Grade II listed building on 9 January 1970.

Statue of Queen Elizabeth
The statue of Queen Elizabeth was sculpted in bronze by Philip Jackson, and portrays her at the time that she was widowed, aged 51. The memorial to Queen Elizabeth cost £2 million, and was funded by a special five-pound coin produced to mark Queen Elizabeth II's 80th birthday.

A second casting of the statue was unveiled in Queen Mother Square, Poundbury, Dorset, on 27 October 2016.

References

External links
 

1955 sculptures
2009 sculptures
Bronze sculptures in the United Kingdom
Buildings and structures on The Mall, London
George VI
Grade II listed statues in the City of Westminster
Monuments and memorials in London
Monuments and memorials to Queen Elizabeth The Queen Mother
Outdoor sculptures in London
Sculptures by Philip Jackson
Sculptures of men in the United Kingdom
Elizabeth
Statues of monarchs
2009 establishments in England